"ASDAN"(Award Scheme Development and Accreditation Network) is a British education charity and awarding organization, headquartered in Bristol. It began as a research project of the University of the West of England in the 1980s, and was formally established as an educational charity in 1991. It provides curriculum programs and qualifications to help young people develop knowledge and skills for learning, work and life. This aim is most directed to help children find jobs and careers.

ASDAN programs and qualifications are delivered by over 3,000 secondary schools, special schools, colleges, alternative education providers and youth organizations across the United Kingdom, and in more than thirty countries and territories overseas. The stated purpose of the charity is "the advancement of education, by providing opportunities for all learners to develop their personal and social attributes and levels of achievement through ASDAN awards and resources, and the relief of poverty, where poverty inhibits such opportunities for learners."

ASDAN's charitable fund provides grants to registered centers of ASDAN to help increase educational opportunity and alleviate the effects of deprivation and poverty, both in the United Kingdom and overseas.

ASDAN's flagship course is Certificate of Personal Effectiveness (CoPE),. It can be studied in Years 10 and 11 (Scottish S4 and S5), or in Post 16 education, either within the whole school PSHE program or within the option system. It aims to develop skills and knowledge in areas such as communication, citizenship and community, beliefs and values, the environment, health and fitness, and independent living, among other things. It is known that CoPE Level 3 offers a tariff of 16 UCAS points towards university admission.

References

Educational charities based in the United Kingdom
Educational organisations based in the United Kingdom
Examination boards in the United Kingdom